Silver Bird may refer to one of the following:

 Machines
Silver Bird (streamliner), a land speed record motorcycle
Silbervogel, a World War II German rocket bomber
 Creative works
"Silver Bird (Mark Lindsay song)", a song by Mark Lindsay
"Silver Bird (Tina Rainford song)", a song by Tina Rainford
A song by The Guess Who